The First Bruce ministry (Nationalist–Country Coalition) was the 16th ministry of the Government of Australia. It was led by the country's 8th Prime Minister, Stanley Bruce. The First Bruce ministry succeeded the Fifth Hughes ministry, which dissolved on 9 February 1923 following the December 1922 federal election and the subsequent resignation of Billy Hughes as Prime Minister. The Nationalists had lost their majority in the election, and had no choice but to negotiate a Coalition deal with the Country Party. However, Country leader Earle Page let it be known that no deal could be made unless Hughes resigned. It is the first ministry that consists of a centre-right Coalition between the senior conservative party and the junior rural party - this Coalition has more or less endured to this day with the modern-day Liberal Party and National Party. The ministry was replaced by the Second Bruce ministry on 18 December 1925 following the 1925 federal election.

Stanley Bruce, who died in 1967, was the last surviving member of the First Bruce ministry; Bruce was also the last surviving member of the Fifth Hughes ministry and the Second Bruce ministry. Earle Page was the last surviving Country minister.

Ministry

References

Ministries of George V
Bruce, 1
1923 establishments in Australia
1925 disestablishments in Australia
Cabinets established in 1923
Cabinets disestablished in 1925